Fabian Posch (born 5 January 1988) is an Austrian handball UHK Krems and the Austrian national team.

References

External links

1988 births
Living people
Austrian male handball players